Parahathlia is a genus of beetles in the family Cerambycidae. This insect is found in Australia.

Species 
It containing the following species:

subgenus Linohathlia
 Parahathlia lineella (Hope, 1842)

subgenus Parahathlia
 Parahathlia melanocephala (Hope, 1841)
 Parahathlia rotundipennis Breuning, 1961

References

Apomecynini